South Walnut Street Historic District is a national historic district located at Edinburgh, Johnson County, Indiana. The district encompasses 41 contributing buildings in a predominantly residential section of Edinburgh. It developed between about 1850 and 1935, and includes notable examples of Greek Revival, Italianate, Queen Anne, Romanesque Revival, and Bungalow / American Craftsman style architecture.  The dwellings include tiny works' cottages, modest middle-class homes, and large expensive homes of the wealthy. Notable buildings include the First Christian Church (1887, now House of Mercy Full Gospel Church) and the Methodist Church.

It was listed on the National Register of Historic Places in 2011.

References

Historic districts on the National Register of Historic Places in Indiana
Italianate architecture in Indiana
Greek Revival architecture in Indiana
Romanesque Revival architecture in Indiana
Queen Anne architecture in Indiana
Historic districts in Johnson County, Indiana
National Register of Historic Places in Johnson County, Indiana